Johann Peter Kellner (variants: Keller, Kelner) (28 September 1705 – 19 April 1772) was a German organist and composer. He was the father of Johann Christoph Kellner.

Biography
He was born in Gräfenroda, Thuringia, and was intended by his parents to follow his father into a career as a lamp-black merchant. He was devoted to music from childhood, and first learnt singing from the cantor Johann Peter Nagel and keyboard from his son Johann Heinrich Nagel. He studied for a year from 1720 with the organist Johann Schmidt in Zella, followed by a year with the organist Hieronymus Florentius Quehl (or Kehl) in Suhl, during which time he also studied composition. He knew Johann Sebastian Bach well, although it is not known whether he was taught by him. He was also acquainted with George Frideric Handel. In 1722, he returned to work as a tutor at Gräfenroda for three years. He was appointed cantor of Frankenhain in October 1725, returning to Gräfenroda in December 1727 as assistant cantor. He became cantor after Nagel's death in 1732, and remained in the post for the rest of his life; his pupils included Johann Philipp Kirnberger, Johannes Ringk, and J.E. Rembt. Kellner was admired as an organist, and performed for the Dukes of Coburg and Weimar and the Prince of Sondershausen.

He played an important role in the dissemination of music by Johann Sebastian Bach, through the many manuscript copies made by him and his circle, particularly of keyboard and organ works, and very importantly the six cello suites. These are the earliest or only source of many works, and provide information on their chronology, compositional history, and authenticity. Russell Stinson has determined that the three movement trio sonata for organ BWV 1039a/BWV 1027a was not made by Bach, but almost certainly a transcription made by Kellner of the first two movements of Bach's Sonata in G major for two flutes and continuo, BWV 1039, and the fourth movement of Bach's Sonata in G major for viola da gamba and harpsichord, BWV 1027.

Compositions
His keyboard music is in typical galant style, though also shows influences of Bach's Well-Tempered Clavier.

Published in Arnstadt.

Organ
Fugue in D minor, BWV Anh. 180
Prelude and Fugue in D minor
2 trios, D major, G major, in Die Orgel II/7 (Lippstadt, 1958)
Prelude in C major, in Orgelmusik um Johann Sebastian Bach (Wiesbaden, 1985)
2 fugues in C minor and D major
3 preludes in C major, C major, and G minor
2 preludes and fugues in G major
It has been suggested that Kellner composed the Toccata and Fugue in D minor, formerly attributed to J.S. Bach

Chorale settings
Herzlich tut mich verlangen, BWV Anh. 47 (Leipzig, 1907) on Herzlich tut mich verlangen
Was Gott tut, das ist wohlgetan (Leipzig, 1907) on "Was Gott tut, das ist wohlgetan"
Wer nur den lieben Gott lässt walten (Wiesbaden, 1985) on "Wer nur den lieben Gott lässt walten"
Lobt Gott, ihr Christen, allzugleich
Nun danket alle Gott, on "Nun danket alle Gott"
Allein Gott in der Höh sei Ehr on "Allein Gott in der Höh sei Ehr"

Keyboard
Certamen musicum, bestehend aus Präludien, Fugen, Allemanden, Couranten, Sarabanden, Giguen, wie *auch Menuetten, 6 suites (1739–1749)
3 Sonates (1752)
Manipulus musices, oder Eine Hand voll kurzweiliger Zeitvertreib, 4 suites (1752–1756)
Concerto in F major (Leipzig, 1956)
2 fugues in A minor and C major
Menuet in A minor
3 preludes and fugues in A minor, C major, and G major
2 sonatas
12 Variationes

Vocal
36 church cantatas, in Stadt- und Universitätsbibliothek, Frankfurt
Annual cycle of church cantatas with organ, 1753 (lost)

Recordings
Only a few works by Kellner have been recorded so far and often they appear in collections of organ music devoted to a school of composers. The following is a list of websites with information about recordings of music by Johann Peter Kellner:

https://www.france-orgue.fr/disque/index.php?zpg=dsq.eng.rch&ior=c&oeu=J.%20P.%20KELLNER&com=Johann%20Peter%20KELLNER&zpaper=1
http://www.allmusic.com/performance/trio-for-organ-in-g-major-arrangement-possibly-by-kellner-bwv-1027a-mq0000942751
http://www.johann-peter-kellner.de/index.php?sub=musikliteratur&page=tontraeger

Notes

References

Further reading
His autobiography is in F.W. Marpurg: Historische-kritische Beyträge zur Aufnahme der Musik (Berlin, 1754–1778)
Gedenkschrift anlässlich der Johann-Peter-Kellner-Festwoche in Gräfenroda (Gräfenroda, 1955)
M. Fechner: Die Klavier- und Orgelwerke Johann Peter Kellners (Diplomarbeit, University of Leipzig, 1965)
H.J. Schulze: Bach-Dokumente III (Kassel and Leipzig, 1972)
Russell Stinson: The Bach Manuscripts of Johann Peter Kellner and his Circle: a Case Study in Reception History (Durham, North Carolina, 1989)
Russell Stinson: Keyboard Transcriptions from the Bach Circle, (Madison, Wisconsin, 1992)

External links

Johann-Peter-Kellner-Gesellschaft

1705 births
1772 deaths
German classical organists
German male organists
German male classical composers
German Baroque composers
German Classical-period composers
People from Saxe-Gotha-Altenburg
Pupils of Johann Sebastian Bach
18th-century classical composers
18th-century male musicians
18th-century keyboardists
Male classical organists